Boston and Maine Railroad Depot may refer to:
Contoocook Railroad Depot, Contoocook, NH, listed on the NRHP in New Hampshire
Ely Railroad Depot, Fairlee, VT, listed on the NRHP in Vermont
Raymond Railroad Depot, Raymond, NH, listed on the NRHP in New Hampshire
Reading Railroad Depot, Reading, Massachusetts, listed on the NRHP in Massachusetts
Stoneham Railroad Depot, Stoneham, Massachusetts, listed on the NRHP in Massachusetts